Ballerini is an Italian surname. Notable people with the surname include:

 Andrea Ballerini (born 1973), Italian motorcycle racer
 Antonio Ballerini (1805–1881), Italian Jesuit theologian
 Davide Ballerini (born 1994), Italian cyclist
 Edoardo Ballerini (born 1970), American actor
 Franco Ballerini (1964–2010), Italian cyclist
 Kelsea Ballerini (born 1993), American country pop singer-songwriter
 Luigi Ballerini (born 1940), Italian poet
 Paolo Angelo Ballerini (1814–1897), Italian Roman Catholic archbishop
 Girolamo and Pietro Ballerini, Italian Catholic theologians and canonists

See also
Ballerini (album), 2020 Kelsea Ballerini album
 Ballarini

Italian-language surnames